In the sharing economy, transfer cars, relocation cars, or driveaways are rental cars that need to be transferred back to their original branch after a one-way rental. Rental car companies have traditionally used truck and train transporters to re-position their fleet until this model was disrupted by websites which let travelers book those transfer cars for free (e.g. Transfercar in Australia, the US and New Zealand and DriveBack in Sweden) or for a very small amount of money (usually €1, e.g. Driiveme and Luckyloc in France). This new model enables rental car companies to save on their relocation costs while offering a way for travelers to save on their travel costs. There is usually a set number of days to transfer the vehicle and limited availability, so this model usually suits travelers with flexible plans.

References

Car rental